The 2021 Svijany Open was a professional tennis tournament played on clay courts. It was the 8th edition of the tournament which was part of the 2021 ATP Challenger Tour. It took place in Liberec, Czech Republic between 2 and 8 August 2021.

Singles main-draw entrants

Seeds

 1 Rankings are as of 26 July 2021.

Other entrants
The following players received wildcards into the singles main draw:
  Jonáš Forejtek
  Dalibor Svrčina
  Michael Vrbenský

The following player received entry into the singles main draw using a protected ranking:
  Gerald Melzer

The following player received entry into the singles main draw as a special exempt:
  Tim van Rijthoven

The following player received entry into the singles main draw as an alternate:
  Malek Jaziri

The following players received entry from the qualifying draw:
  Evan Furness
  Nikola Milojević
  Alexander Ritschard
  Daniel Siniakov

The following player received entry as a lucky loser:
  David Vega Hernández

Champions

Singles

  Alex Molčan def.  Tomáš Macháč 6–0, 6–1.

Doubles

  Roman Jebavý /  Igor Zelenay def.  Geoffrey Blancaneaux /  Maxime Janvier 6–2, 6–7(6–8), [10–5].

References

2021 ATP Challenger Tour
2021
2021 in Czech tennis
Sport in Liberec
August 2021 sports events in the Czech Republic